Samiullah Khan or Samiulla Khan or Sami Ullah Khan can refer to:

 Samiullah Khan, governor of the Princely State of Sahaspur in India
 Samiullah Khan (cricketer), Pakistani international cricketer
 Samiullah Khan (field hockey), Pakistani field hockey player
 Samiulla Khan, former Indian politician
 Sami Ullah Khan, Pakistani politician